Profundiconus is a genus of sea snails, marine gastropod mollusks in the family Conidae, the cone snails and their allies.

As the name of the genus suggests, these species live in deep water. It is presumed that they are vermivorous.

This genus is the type genus of the subfamily Profundiconinae Limpalaër & Monnier, 2018. This is an alternate representation for the family Conidae.

Species
 Profundiconus barazeri Tenorio & Castelin, 2016
 Profundiconus cakobaui (Moolenbeek, Röckel & Bouchet, 2008) 
 Profundiconus dondani (Kosuge, 1981)
 Profundiconus emersoni (Hanna, 1963) 
 Profundiconus frausseni (Tenorio & Poppe, 2004)
 † Profundiconus hennigi Hendricks, 2015 
 Profundiconus ikedai (Ninomiya, 1987) 
 Profundiconus jeanmartini G. Raybaudi Massilia, 1992 
 Profundiconus kanakinus (Richard, 1983)
 Profundiconus lani (Crandall, 1979)
 Profundiconus limpalaeri Tenorio & Monnier, 2016
 Profundiconus loyaltiensis (Röckel & Moolenbeek, 1995)
 Profundiconus maribelae Tenorio & Castelin, 2016
 Profundiconus neocaledonicus Tenorio & Castelin, 2016
 Profundiconus neotorquatus (da Motta, 1985)
 Profundiconus pacificus (Moolenbeek & Röckel, 1996)
 Profundiconus profundorum (Kuroda, 1956) 
 Profundiconus puillandrei Tenorio & Castelin, 2016
 Profundiconus rashafunensis Bozzetti, 2021
 Profundiconus robmoolenbeeki Tenorio, 2016
 Profundiconus scopulicola Okutani, 1972 
 Profundiconus smirna (Bartsch & Rehder, 1943) 
 Profundiconus smirnoides Tenorio, 2015
 Profundiconus stahlschmidti Tenorio & Tucker, 2014
 Profundiconus tarava (Rabiller & Richard, 2014)
 Profundiconus teramachii (Kuroda, 1956) 
 Profundiconus tuberculosus (Tomlin, 1937)
 Profundiconus vaubani (Röckel & Moolenbeek, 1995)
 Profundiconus virginiae Tenorio & Castelin, 2016
 Profundiconus weii Lorenz & Barbier, 2019
 Profundiconus zardoyai Tenorio, 2015
Species brought into synonymy
 Profundiconus bayeri (Petuch, 1987): synonym of Conus bayeri Petuch, 1987
 Profundiconus darkini (Röckel, Korn & Richard, 1993) represented as Conus darkini Röckel, Korn & Richard, 1993 (alternate representation)
 Profundiconus luciae (Moolenbeek, 1986) represented as Conus luciae Moolenbeek, 1986 (alternate representation)
 Profundiconus soyomaruae Okutani, 1964: synonym of  Conus profundorum (Kuroda, 1956), synonym of Profundiconus profundorum (Kuroda, 1956)

References

 Tucker J.K. & Tenorio M.J. (2009) Systematic classification of Recent and fossil conoidean gastropods. Hackenheim: Conchbooks. 296 pp.

External links
 To World Register of Marine Species
 Puillandre N., Duda T.F., Meyer C., Olivera B.M. & Bouchet P. (2015). One, four or 100 genera? A new classification of the cone snails. Journal of Molluscan Studies. 81: 1-23
 Tenorio M.J. & Castelin M. (2016). Genus Profundiconus Kuroda, 1956 (Gastropoda, Conoidea): Morphological and molecular studies, with the description of five new species from the Solomon Islands and New Caledonia. European Journal of Taxonomy. 173: 1-45

 
Conidae